A Nest of Noblemen is a 1914 Russian drama film directed by Vladimir Gardin.

Plot 
This film is a film adaptation of the eponymous novel by Ivan Turgenev.

Cast 
 Olga Preobrazhenskaya
 Lyudmila Sychova
 Mikhail Tamarov
 Yelizaveta Uvarova

References

External links 
 

1914 films
1910s Russian-language films
Russian drama films